Kumudini Government College, also called Kumudini Mohila College, located in Tangail, is a women's college affiliated with Bangladesh National University. The college was established in 1943 by Ranada Prasad Saha, a businessman and philanthropist, became affiliated with the University of Calcutta in 1944, and was nationalized in 1979. Until 1959 when Muminunnisa Mohila College was established in Mymensingh, it was the only women's college in East Pakistan.

Programmes
The college offers higher secondary and degree programmes as well as post-secondary Honours and Masters programmes. The college also arranges cultural, literary and sports programmes for its students.

Famous alumnae
Well-known alumnae of Kumudini College include:
 Shamim Azad, writer
 Niru Shamsunnahar PhD Art Historian Museumologist and Art Critic 
 Khurshid Jahan, politician

References

External links
 College web site (in Bengali), with photo of college gate

Educational institutions established in 1943
Colleges affiliated to National University, Bangladesh
1943 establishments in India
Tangail City
Women's universities and colleges in Bangladesh